ZFOURGE or the FourStar Galaxy Evolution Survey is a large and deep medium-band imaging survey which aims to establish an observational benchmark of galaxy properties at redshift z > 1. The survey is using a very efficient near-infrared FOURSTAR instrument on the Magellan Telescopes, surveying in all three HST legacy fields: COSMOS, CDFS, and UDS.

Scientific aims

ZFOURGE aims to create a benchmark of properties at z > 1 by deriving 1-2% accurate redshifts of ∼60,000 galaxies at 1 < z < 3.

While majority of L∗ galaxies are too faint for spectroscopy, which resulted in inaccurate broadband photometric redshifts in the previous times. To mend that FourStar is equipped with innovative "medium-bandwidth" filters from 1 − 1.8μm, which enable redshifts to z = 3.5.

This allows ZFOURGE to observe galaxy samples from the low mass at z > 1, to measure the value of mass and environment in transformation of galaxies, measure galaxy scaling relations. It will also explore the shape of the stellar mass function to z = 3, and find luminous galaxies at z = 6-9, and identify high-redshift 1.5 < z < 2.5 (proto)clusters.

Instruments
The Fourstar Galaxy Evolution Survey (ZFOURGE) is conducted using the FourStar imager (Persson et al. 2013) on the 6.5m Magellan Baade telescope at Las Campanas Observatory. It is using medium-band filters in the near-IR (van Dokkum et al. 2009) which allows for samplings at wavelengths that bracket the Balmer break of galaxies leading to more well-constrained photometric redshifts at 1 < z < 4 than with broadband filters alone. This dataset provides a comprehensive sampling of the 0.3 – 8 micron spectral energy distribution of galaxies.

ZFOURGE is composed of three 11′ x 11′ pointings with coverage in the CDFS (Giacconi et al. 2002), COSMOS (Capak et al. 2007) and UDS (Lawrence et al. 2007). The 5sigma depth in a circular aperture of D=0.6" in the Ks band is 26.2-26.5 in the CDFS, COSMOS and UDS fields respectively at a typical seeing of ~0.4″. For more information regarding ZFOURGE consult Straatman et al. (2016).

References

External links
ZFOURGE Homepage

Astronomical surveys
Great Observatories program